The Gardner–Salinas braille codes are a method of encoding mathematical and scientific notation linearly using braille cells for tactile reading by the visually impaired. The most common form of Gardner–Salinas braille is the 8-cell variety, commonly called GS8. There is also a corresponding 6-cell form called GS6.

The codes were developed as a replacement for Nemeth Braille by John A. Gardner, a physicist at Oregon State University, and Norberto Salinas, an Argentinian mathematician.

The Gardner–Salinas braille codes are an example of a compact human-readable markup language. The syntax is based on the LaTeX system for scientific typesetting.

Table of Gardner–Salinas 8-dot (GS8) braille

The set of lower-case letters, the period, comma, semicolon, colon, exclamation mark, apostrophe, and opening and closing double quotes are the same as in Grade-2 English Braille.

Digits 

Apart from 0, this is the same as the Antoine notation used in French and Luxembourgish Braille.

Upper-case letters 

GS8 upper-case letters are indicated by the same cell as standard English braille (and GS8) lower-case letters, with dot #7 added.

Compare Luxembourgish Braille.

Greek letters 
Dot 8 is added to the letter forms of International Greek Braille to derive Greek letters:

Characters differing from English Braille

ASCII symbols and mathematical operators

Text symbols

Math and science symbols

Markup 

* Encodes the fraction-slash for the single adjacent digits/letters as numerator and denominator.

* Used for any > 1 digit radicand.

** Used for markup to represent inkprint text.

Typeface indicators

Shape symbols

Set theory

References 

Blind physicist creates better Braille — a CNN news item, November 9, 1995
The world of blind mathematicians — article in Notices of the AMS, November 2002

Braille symbols
8-dot braille scripts
Mathematical notation